TiG7  is a theatre in Mannheim, Baden-Württemberg, Germany.

Theatres in Baden-Württemberg